Nodar Mgaloblishvili (July 15, 1931 in Tiflis, Georgian SSR, Soviet Union – March 26, 2019 in Tbilisi) was a Soviet and Georgian theatrical and cinema actor.

Biography 
In 1954 Nodar Mgaloblishvili graduated from the Shota Rustaveli Theatre and Film University. The same year he started to work in Marjanishvili Theatre as an actor. Meritorious Artist of Georgia (1976), People's Artist of the Georgian SSR  (1979), winner of Hungary Drama and Music Festival (1976), he is best known for his portrayal of Count Cagliostro in Formula of Love directed by Mark Zakharov.

Mgaloblishvili lived and worked in Tbilisi, Georgia.

Selected filmography
 Centaurs (1978) as minister Miguel
Jaqo's Dispossessed (1980, TV Movie) as Teimuraz Eristavi
 Formula of Love (1984) as Alessandro Cagliostro
 Katala (1989) as  Director 
 Spetsnaz (2002) as  Bearded 
 A Second Before...  (2007, TV Series) as  The Devil

References

External links
 
 Жизнь и смерть «графа Калиостро». Формула любви Нодара Мгалоблишвили

1931 births
2019 deaths
Actors from Tbilisi
Soviet male actors
Russian male actors
Male stage actors from Georgia (country)
Male film actors from Georgia (country)
20th-century male actors from Georgia (country)
People's Artists of Georgia